Skydancer or variants may refer to:

Air dancer, air puppet used in outdoors advertising
Sky Dancers, range of dolls
Sky Dancers (TV series), animated series based on the dolls

Albums
Skydancer (Dark Tranquillity album), 1993
Skydancer (In Hearts Wake album), 2015